Romper Stomper is an Australian television series that was released on video streaming service Stan on 1 January 2018.  It is created as a sequel to the 1992 film of the same name and is set 25 years after the events in the film. The six-part series follows a new generation of fictional far-left activists and their far-right, fascist counterparts, with the story focussing on a fictional far-right anti-Islamic group led by Blake Farron (Lachy Hulme) known as Patriot Blue. Jacqueline McKenzie, Dan Wyllie and John Brumpton reprise their roles from the original film.

The series is produced by John Edwards and Dan Edwards for Roadshow Rough Diamond. The original film's director, Geoffrey Wright, directs two episodes, alongside fellow directors Daina Reid and James Napier Robertson. The series was commissioned by Stan in January 2017, and was filmed in Melbourne across 9 weeks in August.

Cast
 Toby Wallace as Kane, a young man who becomes involved with the Patriot Blue group
 Jacqueline McKenzie as Gabrielle Jordan, Kane's mother
 Dan Wyllie as Vic/Cackles
 John Brumpton as Magoo
 Lachy Hulme as Blake Farron, leader of right-wing group Patriot Blue
 Sophie Lowe as Zoe, Farron's wife
 David Wenham as Jago Zoric, a right-wing talk-show host
 Jeremy Lindsay Taylor as Marco, an Australian Federal Police officer who is having an affair with Gabe
 Markella Kavenagh as Cindi, Kane's stepsister who escapes from juvenile detention
 Nicole Chamoun as Laila Taheer, a young law student
 Julian Maroun as Farid, Laila's boyfriend
 Jamie Abdallah as Malik, Farid's brother, an MMA fighter
 Lily Sullivan as Petra, a leader of the anti-fascist group Antifasc
 Louis Corbett as Tomas, a member of Antifasc
 Tysan Towney as Danny, a lead member of Antifasc
 Kaden Hartcher as Stix, Kane's friend
 Philip Hayden as McKew, Laila's university lecturer who is involved with Antifasc

Release 
All six episodes of the series became available on Stan on 1 January 2018. International broadcast rights for the series covering Asia, parts of Europe, Latin America and northern Africa were sold to SundanceTV Global.

Episodes

References

External links
 
 
 Roadshow Rough Diamond

2018 Australian television series debuts
2010s Australian crime television series
2010s Australian drama television series
2010s crime drama television series
English-language television shows
Racism in television
Television shows set in Melbourne
Australian political drama television series
Television series about neo-Nazism
Stan (service) original programming